The El Caguán DMZ was a demilitarized zone of 42,000 km² in southern Colombia authorized by the government of President Andrés Pastrana to negotiate a peace process with the Revolutionary Armed Forces of Colombia (FARC-EP). It existed for three years, from 1999 until 2002.

On October 8, 1998, then presidential candidate Andrés Pastrana agreed with FARC commanders to create a demilitarized zone in the region of El Caguán river basin, a jungle region in south central Colombia made up by the municipalities of Vista Hermosa, La Macarena, La Uribe and Mesetas in Meta Department, and San Vicente del Caguán in Caquetá Department to negotiate a possible peace process.

External links
 El Colombiano; El Caguán un año despues
 El Caguán

FARC
Demilitarized zones
1999 establishments in Colombia
2002 disestablishments in Colombia